Veliyathunad is a village spread over Aluva Taluk and Paravur Taluk of Eranakulam district in the Indian state of Kerala. Veliyathunad is situated near Aluva town. Veliyathunad is one of rarest greenery sights in Eranakulam District: even though Veliyathunad people have all the benefits of a rural area they face few of the problems of other rural areas.

Veliyathunad is a part of Karumalloor panchayat and is situated 7 kilometers from Aluva Railway Station, 10 kilometers from North Paravur Bus Stand and 12 kilometers from Cochin International Airport. The village is bounded by distributaries of the Periyar river. It consists of large tracts of paddy fields and is mainly a rice-based agrarian economy. However, due to losses in paddy farming many farmers have recently changed to banana farms.

Institutions
 Govt M.I.U.P School Veliyathunad 
 The Alwaye Settlement H.S. School
 Jyothi Nivas Public School
 Muhammed Abdul Rahman Sahib Library
 Veliyathunad Post Office
 Govt. Ayurveda Dispensary
 Veliyathunad Co-operative Bank
 Janaseva Sisubhavan
 Welfare Association Trust
 Thanthra Vidya Peedham
 Carmelgiri St.Joseph Pontifical Seminary
 Kolbe Asramam
 Similia Homeo Lab
 Ice Station
 Govt Homoeo Dispensary
 Thomas Clinic Malikempeedika

Localities
Parana, Thandirikkal, Aduvathuruth, Thadikkakadav, Cheriyath, Kadooppadam, Millupady, Vayalodam, Kanypady, Pallypadi, Madrassapady, Paruvakkad, Aattilpuzhakkav, Mariyappady, Vayalakkad, Parelipallam, Laksham Veedu, 4Cent, Societyppady, Mambra, Valliyappanpady

Places of Worship

Churches

 St. Thomas Orthodox Syrian Church

Masjids
 Hidayathul Anam Madrassa & Masjid Madrassapady, Veliyathunad 
 W. Veliyathunadu Jum'a Masjid
 E. Veliyathunadu Jum'a Masjid
 Kadoopadam Jum'a Masjid
 Thadikkakadav Jum'a Masjid
 Badriya Masjid, Aduvathuruth
 Salafi Masjid, Parana
 Arafa Masjid, parana
 Millupady Masjid
 Minarul Huda Masjid.
 Masjid Abdullah Khayath
 MasjidulRahma Vayalakad

Temples

 Aattippuzhakkav Bhagavathi Temple https://goo.gl/maps/CZaa8QbuoEtYGgT9A
 Cheriyath Narasimha Swamy Temple
 Vellam Bhagavathi Temple
 Mullakkal Temple
 Alungal Bhagavathi Temple
 Chirangara Temple

References 

Villages in Ernakulam district